Dragoljub "Ljuba" Vidačić (born December 26, 1970) is a Serbian basketball coach and former player.

Early life
Born to a father from Trebinje and mother from Gornji Milanovac, Vidačić was raised in Višegrad with three older brothers.

Coaching career 
Vidačić started his career as coach of Crvena zvezda Juniors in 2008–09, in 2010 he was named as head coach of KK Varda Višegrad from Višegrad and from 2012 to 2014 he was coach of KK Bosna.

External links
Dragoljub Vidačić at fibaeurope.com

1970 births
Living people
BC Cherkaski Mavpy players
Bosnia and Herzegovina basketball coaches
Bosnia and Herzegovina men's basketball players
Bosnia and Herzegovina expatriate basketball people in Serbia
İstanbul Teknik Üniversitesi B.K. players
KK Bosna Royal coaches
KK Crvena zvezda players
KK Crvena zvezda youth coaches
KK Hemofarm players
KK IMT Beograd players
KK Lavovi 063 players
KK Leotar coaches
KK Partizan players
KK Rabotnički players
KK Vojvodina Srbijagas players
KK Spartak Subotica coaches
Makedonikos B.C. players
People from Trebinje
Serbian men's basketball coaches
Serbian expatriate basketball people in North Macedonia
Serbian expatriate basketball people in Turkey
Serbian expatriate basketball people in Ukraine
Serbs of Bosnia and Herzegovina
Serbian men's basketball players
Point guards